Radha Enna Penkutti is a 1979 Indian Malayalam film, directed by Balachandra Menon and produced by Krishnaswami Reddiar. The film stars Sankaradi, Sukumaran, Baby Sumathi and Jalaja in the lead roles. The film has musical score by Shyam.

Cast
 
Sankaradi 
Sukumaran 
Baby Sumathi 
Jalaja 
Ravi Menon 
Vidhubala

Soundtrack
The music was composed by Shyam.

References

External links
 

1979 films
1970s Malayalam-language films
Films directed by Balachandra Menon